Klute is a crater on the Moon's far side. It lies to the southeast of the larger walled plain Fowler, and east of the crater Gadomski.

Klute is a heavily worn crater with multiple smaller craters along the outer rim.  The satellite crater Klute W impacted to the northwest of Klute, and a large slump or landslide has occurred where material has flowed into the unnamed crater within Klute. The remainder of the floor is an uneven plain marked with several small, eroded craters.

This crater was named after Dr. Daniel Klute in 1970, a scientist who helped develop engines for the Saturn V rocket before he died in 1964.

Satellite craters
By convention these features are identified on lunar maps by placing the letter on the side of the crater midpoint that is closest to Klute.

References

 
 
 
 
 
 
 
 
 
 
 
 

Impact craters on the Moon